Valentin Gavrilovich Ivakin (26 March 1930 – 24 November 2010) was a Soviet football goalkeeper and manager.

Playing career
Valentin Ivakin was born in Uryupinsk. At the age of 17 without former training in football he joined the local football club Pishevik. In 1952 he was sent for military service to Riga, Latvian SSR where he won the Latvian Higher League title and the Latvian Cup playing with AVN Riga. After the season Ivakin was selected to join Daugava Riga - the top football club in Soviet Latvia. Over two seasons he played 32 matches for Daugava, showing impressive performances which led to him being transferred to one of the top Soviet clubs - CDKA Moscow. In 1957 he moved to another top Moscow side - Spartak Moscow with which he won the Soviet Top League gold in 1958 and 1962, in addition to the Soviet Cup in 1958. At the age of 32 Ivakin had to leave Spartak as it was a usual practice in Soviet football to force footballers to retire at the age of 31-32, however Ivakin moved to FC Shinnik Yaroslavl with which he played until 1967. Ivakin also played one international match for USSR national football team - in a 1-0 victory against China in 1959.

Coaching career
Upon retiring from playing Ivakin was appointed club director of Shinnik Yaroslavl. In later years he mostly worked with young footballers in Moscow, his only experience coaching a senior club was in 1979 when he was the head coach of second league club FC Spartak Ryazan. From 1986 to 1987 he coached the USSR U-21 national team. He was the first coach of Dmitri Kombarov and Kirill Kombarov.

References

1930 births
2010 deaths
Russian footballers
Russian football managers
Soviet footballers
Soviet football managers
FC Spartak Moscow players
PFC CSKA Moscow players
Daugava Rīga players
Soviet Union international footballers
Association football goalkeepers
Burials in Troyekurovskoye Cemetery
FC Shinnik Yaroslavl players